John McMurtry may refer to:

 John McMurtry (academic), professor of philosophy at the University of Guelph
 John McMurtry (architect) (1812–1890), American builder and architect who worked in Lexington, Kentucky